Chukwuka Ekweani (born 16 July 1995) (better known by his stage name Ckay) (stylised as CKay), is a Nigerian singer-songwriter and record producer signed to Warner Music South Africa, and Atlantic Records. He was formerly signed to Chocolate City, a member of Warner Music Group independent label services ADA. His international hit single "Love Nwantiti", also known as "Love Nwantiti (Ah Ah Ahh)", was released in 2019 by Chocolate City. On 29 March 2022, the song debuted at number one, following the launch of the Billboard Afrobeats chart. On 9 May 2022, it became the first-ever African song to surpass one billion streams on Spotify and has since been deemed "the biggest hit in African history".

Asa Asika signed Ckay to The Plug Entertainment, under management during the early peak of his global career as Ckay's manager.

Early life 
Chukwuka Ekweani was born in Kaduna, a state in the north-western region of Nigeria. He is of Igbo descent from Anambra State. His love for music was driven by his father, who was a choir conductor at their local church. While growing up, he was moved by musical instruments, which prompted him to learn the piano from his father. Thereafter, a friend introduced him to the production software Fruity Loops. Chukwuka started off his music career as a member of a band, made up of him and two other band mates, before beginning his solo career as CKay.

Career

2014–2017: Chocolate City and Who the Fuck Is CKay?
In 2014, he relocated to Lagos, after he got discovered. While signed to Loopy Music, he began working with Chocolate City, in early 2015. On 6 May 2016, he released a promotional single titled "Bad Musician Bad Producer", with its instrumental made available for free downloads across all Nigerian blogs for commercial use for covers, club, and airplay. Following the merger of Loopy Music in 2016, he officially joined Chocolate City artist roster on 31 August 2016. On 23 October 2016, "Bad Musician Bad Producer" cover by Kelly Joe, was nominated by TNMA and earned CKay, a special recognition. On 11 September 2017, he released Who the Fuck Is CKay? - ep, through Chocolate City.

2018–2021: "Love Nwantiti", Warner Music Africa and "Emiliana"
On 2 March 2018 he released "Container", an Afrobeat record influenced by the South African gwara gwara dance style. The song became a breakthrough record in Nigeria and earned him substantial airplay. It was released through Chocolate City, and was produced by Tempoe. On 6 July 2018, he released the music video, directed and shot by the Myth. On 30 August 2019, he released his second extended play CKay the First through Chocolate City. The project spawned the hit track "Love Nwantiti", which became a major record in Nigeria. On 14 February 2020, CKay released a remix titled "Love Nwantiti (Ah Ah Ah)" featuring Joeboy and Kuami Eugene. In 2021, it went viral on TikTok and became an international hit, charting across Europe, Africa, Australia and New Zealand, also reaching number 23 in the UK and earned him his first entry on the US Billboard Hot 100. A North African remix featuring ElGrande Toto became popular in the Maghreb countries and in Germany. A French remix featured Franglish, a German remix featuring Frizzo, Joeboy, and Kuami Eugene, the Spanish version with De La Ghetto, the East African remix featuring Rayvanny, and a South African remix featuring Tshego and Gemini Major.

On 13 November 2020, he appeared on the song "La La" from Davido's studio album A Better Time, released through Davido Music Worldwide, RCA Records, and Sony Music. On 11 February 2021, he released his third ep Boyfriend through Warner Music South Africa. On 4 May 2021, CKay tweeted “I’m NOT signed to Chocolate City. I’m signed to Warner Music South Africa.” On 28 July 2021, he received a Silver Creator Award from YouTube, at 100k subscribers. On 6 August 2021,  he appeared on the song "Beggie Beggie" from Ayra Starr's debut studio album 19 & Dangerous, released through Mavin Records. On 8 October 2021, Ckay became the first African artist to hit 20 Million Spotify Listeners, with over 21 million monthly listeners on his Spotify page. On 3 November 2021, he reviled his record deal with Atlantic on Power 99.1 FM. On 3 December 2021, CKay released "Emiliana", and "By Your Side" featuring Blxckie. On 1 April 2022, the music video was released and directed by Mosh. Emiliana charted across Europe, and Africa, also reaching number 9 in France and earning him, his first top 5 ranking on the Nigeria TurnTable Top 50 chart. On 26 May 2022, Emiliana was certified platinum in France.

2022–present: "Watawi"
On 24 May 2022, Starr's "Beggie Beggie" earned him, a special recognition at The Headies, in the Best Collaboration category. On 17 June 2022, he released "Watawi", featuring Davido, Focalistic, and Abidoza, which peaked at number 13 on Nigeria's TurnTable Top 50 and was accompanied by a music video, directed by Dalia Dias. On 20 June 2022, CKay became the second African artist to reach 1.2 billion streams and was surpassed by 200 million streams from Burna Boy, as the most-streamed with a total of 1.4 billion streams. On 18 August 2022, CKay surpassed 100 Million Streams On Boomplay, and was given a golden club plaque from Boomplay. According to Boomplay data analysis, CKay music has been part of 3,549 playlists with over 120 countries enjoying and streaming Ckay songs on Boomplay as of 18 August 2022.

Artistry 

CKay has personally dubbed his sound "Emo-afrobeats", to note his focus on emotional and romantic lyricism in his music. CKay has made tracks in a variety genres including Afrobeats, R&B and dancehall. On 4 June 2019, in an interview with Ayo Onikoyi of Vanguard Nigeria, he described his style of music as Afro-pop from the future (2056 A.D specifically). On 24 September 2021, the OCC writer Helen Ainsley, describes CKay's music as fusing Afrobeats with pop, electronic music, and even interpolating classical music. On 29 October 2021, Nelson C.J. of Teen Vogue, listed CKay among other Nigerian artists confused to be Alté singers.

Discography

Extended plays
Who the Fuck Is CKay? (2017)
CKay the First (2019)
Boyfriend (2021)
Album
Sad Romance (2022)

Accolades

Tours 

 Sad Romance Tour (2022)

References

External links 
CKay official YouTube channel

1995 births
Living people
21st-century Nigerian male singers
Nigerian singer-songwriters
Igbo musicians
Nigerian record producers
Igbo-language singers
Nigerian male pop singers
Nigerian alté singers
Warner Music Group artists
English-language singers from Nigeria